The 2023 FIFA U-17 World Cup will be the 19th edition of the FIFA U-17 World Cup, the biennial international men's youth football championship contested by the under-17 national teams of the member associations of FIFA. It will be held in Peru from 10 November to 2 December 2023.

The FIFA U-17 World Cup returns after four years due to the COVID-19 pandemic forced FIFA to cancel the tournament in 2021.

Brazil are the defending champions, having won in 2019.

Host selection

Peru were announced as the 2021 U-17 World Cup hosts following a FIFA Council meeting on 24 October 2019 in Shanghai, China.

After the 2021 tournament was cancelled, it was decided on 24 December 2020 to award the 2023 hosting rights to Peru.

This will be the second time that Peru hosts a FIFA tournament, having previously done so in the 2005 FIFA U-17 World Championship.

Venues
In June 2022, the Peruvian Football Federation and Instituto Peruano del Deporte proposed Piura, Chiclayo, Lima, Callao and Tacna as the host cities of the tournament, with Miguel Grau (Piura), Elías Aguirre, Nacional, Miguel Grau (Callao) and Jorge Basadre stadiums to host the matches.

Piura, Chiclayo and Lima, with the same stadiums, were also host cities in the 2005 FIFA U-17 World Cup.

Originally Piura, Chiclayo, Lima and Iquitos (also host cities in 2005) were the four cities proposed to host the tournament. However, Iquitos was later rejected and replaced by Callao and Tacna.

Qualified teams
A total of 24 teams will qualify for the final tournament. Peru as host team along with 23 other teams qualified from six separate continental competitions.

Russia was banned from participation due to the country's invasion of Ukraine.

Draw
The draw will be held in August 2023 in Lima.

The 24 teams will be drawn into six groups of four teams, with the hosts Peru automatically seeded to Pot 1 and placed into the first position of Group A.

The draw will start with the host Peru to A1, the teams from Pot 1 will be drawn first, the teams from Pots 2, 3 and 4 need to skip groups to avoid geographical clash and there will be no 2 teams to play from the same confederation, then the draw will conclude with teams from Pot 4.

Group stage
All times are local, PET (UTC−5).

Group A

Group B

Group C

Group D

Group E

Group F

Ranking of third-placed teams
The four best third-placed teams from the six groups advance to the knockout stage along with the six group winners and six runners-up.

Sponsorship

Adidas

References

External links

 
2023
2023 in Peruvian football
2023 in youth association football
2023 Fifa U-17 World Cup
Scheduled association football competitions
Sports events affected by the 2022 Russian invasion of Ukraine